Edison Suárez (born November 6, 1966 in Montevideo, Uruguay) is a former Uruguayan footballer who played for clubs in Uruguay, Spain, Chile and Colombia and the Uruguay national football team.

Teams
  Danubio 1987–1990
  Real Zaragoza 1991–1992
  Nacional 1993–1994
  Danubio 1995
  Palestino 1996
  Central Español 1997
  Millonarios 1998–1999
  Rocha 2000
  Fénix 2001–2002

External links
 Profile at BDFútbol
 

1966 births
Living people
Uruguayan footballers
Uruguayan expatriate footballers
Uruguay international footballers
Club Nacional de Football players
Centro Atlético Fénix players
Danubio F.C. players
Rocha F.C. players
Central Español players
Real Zaragoza players
Club Deportivo Palestino footballers
Millonarios F.C. players
Uruguayan Primera División players
Chilean Primera División players
La Liga players
Categoría Primera A players
Expatriate footballers in Chile
Expatriate footballers in Spain
Expatriate footballers in Colombia

Association football midfielders